Aghadowey was a station which served Aghadowey in County Londonderry, Northern Ireland.

History

The station was opened by the Belfast and Northern Counties (Derry Central) railways. The station then passed to the Ulster Transport Authority under whose management it was closed.

References 

 

Disused railway stations in County Londonderry
Railway stations opened in 1880
Railway stations closed in 1950
1880 establishments in Ireland
1950 disestablishments in Northern Ireland
Railway stations in Northern Ireland opened in the 19th century